Nerita adenensis, also called the Aden Nerite, is a species of sea snail, a marine gastropod mollusk in the family Neritidae.

Description

Distribution
THe mollusk is near the red sea, near Aden.

References

External link
Morphological plasticity of the Aden Nerite, Nerita adenensis Mienis, 1978 (Gastropoda: Cycloneritida: Neritidae)

Neritidae
Gastropods described in 1978